Nurse Betty is a 2000 American black comedy film directed by Neil LaBute and starring Renée Zellweger as the title character, a small town, Kansas housewife-waitress who suffers a nervous breakdown after witnessing her husband's torture murder, and starts obsessively pursuing her favorite television soap opera character (Greg Kinnear), while in a fugue state. Morgan Freeman and Chris Rock play the hitmen who killed her husband and subsequently pursue her to Los Angeles.

The film premiered at the 2000 Cannes Film Festival. The film won the Cannes Film Festival Award for Best Screenplay. For her performance, Zellweger won the Golden Globe Award for Best Actress – Motion Picture Musical or Comedy. The film was also a commercial success.

Plot
In the small Kansas town of Fair Oaks, diner waitress Betty Sizemore is a fan of the soap opera A Reason to Love. She has no idea that her husband Del, a car salesman, is having a sexual affair with another woman. She also doesn't know that her husband supplements his income by selling drugs. When Betty calls to ask about borrowing a Buick LeSabre for her birthday, Del tells her to take a different car. She manages to sneak the car for herself, anyway, although unbeknownst to her, a large stash of drugs are hidden in the LeSabre's trunk. Two hitmen, Charlie and Wesley, come to Betty and Del's house. Charlie threatens to scalp Del if he doesn't reveal where the drugs are, and Del reveals that he has hidden the drugs in the trunk of the LeSabre; afterwards, Wesley still scalps Del after misunderstanding Charlie's silent communication. Betty witnesses the murder and enters a fugue state, assuming the identity of a character in A Reason to Love who is a nurse.

That evening, Sheriff Eldon Ballard, local reporter Roy Ostery, and several policemen examine the crime scene while Betty calmly packs a suitcase. She seems oblivious to the murder, even with the investigation going on right in her house. At the police station, a psychiatrist examines her. Betty spends the night at her friend's house, sleeping in a child's bedroom. In the middle of the night, she gets into the LeSabre and drives off. She stops at a bar in Williams, Arizona, where the bartender talks about her vacation in Rome; Betty tells her that she was once engaged to a famous surgeon (describing the lead character from A Reason to Love). Meanwhile, the two hitmen are in pursuit, having realized that Betty has the car with the drugs. As they search, Charlie's heart begins to soften towards Betty, to Wesley's consternation.

In Los Angeles, Betty tries to get a job as a nurse while looking for her long-lost "ex-fiancé". She is turned down because she has no résumé or references, but when she saves a young shooting victim's life with a technique she learned from the show, the hospital offers her a job in the pharmacy but forbids her to touch any more patients. Despite her position, Betty becomes popular with patients and their families. She ends up living with Rosa, the older sister of the young man she helped earlier, in gratitude for saving his life. Rosa is also a legal secretary and offers to help Betty find her surgeon boyfriend. She learns from a colleague that "David" is a soap opera character, and goes to the pharmacy window to confront Betty. Thinking her friend is jealous, Betty is impervious to the revelation.

Betty's lawyer supplies tickets to a charity function where George McCord, the actor portraying David, will be appearing. Betty meets George at the function. George is inclined to dismiss her as an overimaginative fan, but something about her compels him to talk to her. He begins to think that Betty is an actress determined to get a part on A Reason to Love, so he decides to play along. After three hours of her "staying in character", he takes her home. George begins falling in love with Betty, and he and his producer decide to bring her onto the show as a new character: Nurse Betty. When Betty arrives on set, she falls out of her fantasy world back into real life. After two failed takes, she realizes that she is on a set and that the people she thought were real are just characters. George confronts her and Betty walks out.

Back at Rosa's house, Betty is telling her roommate what happened when the two hitmen walk in and take Betty and Rosa hostage at gunpoint. Charlie and Wesley tie up the two women and are subsequently interrupted by Roy and Sheriff Ballard, who have also tracked down Betty. A standoff ensues until Ballard pulls a gun from an ankle holster and shoots Wesley dead, who is revealed to be Charlie's son. Charlie decides not to kill Betty and commits suicide in the bathroom. George offers Betty a job on the show. She appears in 63 episodes and takes a vacation in Rome. Betty later plans to pursue nursing as a career.

Cast
 Morgan Freeman as Charlie
 Renée Zellweger as Betty Sizemore
 Chris Rock as Wesley
 Greg Kinnear as George McCord (Dr. David Ravell)
 Aaron Eckhart as Del Sizemore
 Tia Texada as Rosa Hernandez
 Crispin Glover as Roy Ostery
 Pruitt Taylor Vince as Sheriff Eldon Ballard
 Allison Janney as Lyla Branch
 Kathleen Wilhoite as Sue Ann Rogers
 Elizabeth Mitchell as Chloe Jensen
 Harriet Sansom Harris as Ellen
 Sheila Kelley as Joyce
 Sung-Hi Lee as Jasmine
 Steven Gilborn as Blake
 Christopher McDonald (deleted scene) as Duane Cooley

Reception

Critical reception
Nurse Betty received very positive reviews from critics and has a rating of 83% on Rotten Tomatoes based on 131 reviews with an average rating of 7.2/10. The consensus states "Quirky in the best sense of the word, Nurse Betty finds director Neil LaBute corralling a talented cast in service of a sharp, imaginative script." On Metacritic, the film has a weighted average score of 69 out of 100, based on 34 critics, indicating "generally favorable reviews".

Roger Ebert awarded the film three stars out of four, praising its depth but noting its emotional ambiguity: "Nurse Betty is one of those films where you don't know whether to laugh or cringe, and find yourself doing both."

Box office
The film opened at #2 at the North American box office making $7.1 million USD in its opening weekend, behind The Watcher. The film eventually grossed $25 million at the US box office before generating more than $33 million from US home video rental,
 and turning a substantial profit.

Awards
 American Comedy Awards:
 Funniest Actress in a Motion Picture (Renée Zellweger)
 Black Reel Awards:
 Best Actor (Morgan Freeman)
 Best Supporting Actor (Chris Rock)
 British Independent Film Awards:
 Best Foreign Film – English Language
 Cannes Film Festival:
 Best Screenplay (James Flamberg and John C. Richards)
 Edgar Allan Poe Awards:
 Best Motion Picture
 Golden Globe Awards:
 Best Actress – Motion Picture Musical or Comedy (Renée Zellweger)
 Image Awards:
 Outstanding Supporting Actor in a Motion Picture (Morgan Freeman)
 London Film Critics:
 Actress of the Year (Renée Zellweger)
 Satellite Awards:
 Best Actress – Motion Picture Musical or Comedy (Renée Zellweger)
 Best Picture – Musical or Comedy
 Best Supporting Actor – Musical or Comedy Morgan Freeman

References

External links
 
 
 
 Nurse Betty review at Cult Fiction

2000s English-language films
2000 black comedy films
2000s crime comedy-drama films
2000s satirical films
American black comedy films
American crime comedy-drama films
American independent films
American LGBT-related films
American satirical films
Fictional nurses
Films about drugs
Films about nurses
Films directed by Neil LaBute
2000 films
USA Films films
Films about fandom
Films featuring a Best Musical or Comedy Actress Golden Globe winning performance
Films produced by Steve Golin
Films set in Los Angeles
Films shot in Los Angeles
Films shot in Colorado
Films shot in Italy
Gramercy Pictures films
Lesbian-related films
Films scored by Rolfe Kent
2000 comedy films
2000 independent films
Films about soap operas
2000s American films